Mayora is a surname. Notable people with the surname include:

Diego Mayora (born 1992), Peruvian footballer
Enriqueta Mayora (1921–1989), Mexican fencer
Julio Mayora (born 1996), Venezuelan weightlifter
Matthew Mayora (born 1986), Australian footballer